The Swarm is a 1990 Soviet drama film directed by Vladimir Khotinenko.

Plot 
The film tells about the life of the Zavarzins family, who in 1909 went to live in Siberia and founded an apiary there.

Cast 
 Vladimir Ilyin		
 Cheslav Sushkevich	
 Ivan Agafonov
 V. Andrianov
 Oleg Belov
 Aleksandr Cheskidov
 Natalya Churkina	
 Sergey Fetisov
 Boris Galkin
 Gennadiy Garbuk

References

External links 
 
 

1990 films
1990s Russian-language films
Soviet drama films
1990 drama films